The 60th Directors Guild of America Awards, honoring the outstanding directorial achievements in films, documentary and television in 2007, were presented on January 26, 2008, at the Hyatt Regency Century Plaza. The ceremony was hosted by Carl Reiner. The nominees in the feature film category were announced on January 8, 2008, and the nominations for directorial achievement in television, documentaries and commercials were announced on January 10, 2008.

The awards were noted in the media for an incident in which actress Sean Young was ejected from the ceremony by security guards for heckling the stage and other behavior.

Winners and nominees

Film

Television

Commercials

Frank Capra Achievement Award
 Liz Ryan

Franklin J. Schaffner Achievement Award
 Barbara J. Roche

Honorary Life Member
 Jay Roth

References

External links
 

Directors Guild of America Awards
2007 film awards
2007 guild awards
2007 television awards
Direct
Direct
Directors Guild of America Awards
Directors